Cyphogastra calepyga is a Jewel Beetle of the Buprestidae family.

Description
The basic colour is metallic dark blue, with green reflections.

Distribution
This species is indigenous to the Kai Islands of Indonesia.

References
 Biolib
 Universal Biological Indexer

External links
 Coleop-terra

Buprestidae
calepyga
Beetles described in 1857